Side by side or side-by-side may refer to:

Pairs and parallel arrangements
 Side-by-side (graphic), a type of split-screen format in television broadcasts
 Side-by-side (vehicle), a utility terrain vehicle
 Side-by-side assembly, a Microsoft Windows technology for alleviating DLL issues
 Air Command Commander Side-By-Side, an American gyroplane design
 Side-by-side display, a type of stereo display for 3D imaging
 Side-by-side elements, in pair skating
 Side-by-side seating, an alternative to a tandem arrangement
 Side-by-side shotgun, a type of double-barreled shotgun
 A type of refrigerator

Film, television, and video games
 Side by Side (1975 film), a British comedy directed by Bruce Beresford
 Side by Side (1988 film), a film featuring Milton Berle
 Side by Side (1982 film), an American television film about the Osmond family
 Side by Side (2012 film), an American documentary by Christopher Kenneally
 Side by Side (film festival), an international LGBT film festival in Russia
 Side by Side (game series) or Battle Gear, a 1996–2006 racing video game series
 Side by Side (TV series), a 1992–1993 British sitcom
 "Side by Side", a segment of the 2017 Thai television series Project S: The Series
 "Side by Side", a Price Is Right pricing game on the American game show
 Lado a Lado (lit. Side by Side), a 2012 Brazilian telenovela

Music
 Side by Side (band), an American hardcore punk band whose only release is the 1988 EP You're Only Young Once...

Albums
 Side by Side (Duke Ellington and Johnny Hodges album), 1959
 Side by Side (Imperials album), 1983
 Side by Side (Oscar Peterson and Itzhak Perlman album), 1994
 Side by Side, by Pat Boone, 1959
 Side by Side, by Richie Cole and Phil Woods, 1980

Songs
 "Side by Side" (1927 song), a song by Gus Kahn and Harry Woods, popularized by Kay Starr
 "Side by Side" (Earth, Wind & Fire song), 1983
 "Side by Side" (Feeder song), 2011
 "Side by Side" (Lynsey de Paul song), theme song from the 1975 film
 "Side by Side", by Barry Crump
 "Side by Side", by Bladee and Thaiboy Digital from Icedancer, 2018
 "Side by Side", by Rebecca St. James from Rebecca St. James, 1994
 "Side by Side", by Sofia Wylie from the animated special Marvel Rising: Chasing Ghosts in the Marvel Rising franchise, 2019
 "Side by Side", by Will Young from From Now On, 2002

Other uses
 Side by Side (Italy), a political party
Side by Side, a quarterly magazine published by CAFOD, the official aid agency of the Catholic Church in England and Wales

See also
 "Side by Side by Side", a song composed by Stephen Sondheim, from the 1970 musical Company
 Side by Side by Sondheim, a 1976 stage show celebrating Sondheim